Undercover X is a 2001 action-adventure film that was directed by and stars Scott Shaw.

Plot
"In the 2001 film Undercover X (aka No Boundaries), Shaw plays an undercover LAPD detective named Truck Baker, a cross between action star Chuck Norris and The Dude from The Big Lebowski. He's laid-back, but he can also tear your head off with his bare hands. Newcomer Richard Magram plays Shaw's hyperactive partner Torino, who rambles on and on like Joe Pesci after four cups of espresso."

The feature was filmed in Hollywood, California, Seoul, South Korea, Tokyo and Kamakura, Japan.

This film is considered a "Zen Film" in that it was created in the distinct style of filmmaking formulated by Scott Shaw known as Zen Filmmaking. In this style of filmmaking, no scripts are used.

References

External links
 Undercover X Official Website
 
 

2001 films
2000s action adventure films
American action adventure films
Films shot in Seoul
Films shot in Tokyo
2000s English-language films
Films directed by Scott Shaw
2000s American films